Roberto Solozábal Villanueva (born 15 September 1969) is a Spanish former footballer who played as a central defender.

He appeared in 273 La Liga games over 11 seasons, representing in the competition Atlético Madrid and Betis.

Club career

Atlético Madrid
A product of local Atlético Madrid's youth system, Madrid-born Solozábal represented the first team from 1989 to 1997, his debut being on 2 September in a 3–1 away win against Valencia CF (90 minutes played). Other than his first season – ten appearances – he never played less than 18 La Liga games during his eight-year spell.

During the 1995–96 campaign, Solózabal formed a solid centre-back partnership with another Colchonero youth graduate, Juan Manuel López, as the capital side achieved an historic double, with the former featuring in 40 league matches.

Betis
After leaving Atlético, Solozábal signed with Real Betis. In his last season, where the Andalusian club was relegated and he was ousted from the squad for allegedly organising a riot, he ultimately took it to court for lack of payment in a suit which lasted several years, with the player having already retired.

International career
Solozábal was part of the Spanish side that won the gold medal at the 1992 Summer Olympics in Barcelona, and also earned 12 full caps in two years, the first coming on 17 April 1991 in a 0–2 friendly loss to Romania, in Cáceres.

Honours
Atlético Madrid
La Liga: 1995–96
Copa del Rey: 1990–91, 1991–92, 1995–96

Spain U23
Summer Olympic Games: 1992

References

External links

1969 births
Living people
Spanish footballers
Footballers from Madrid
Association football defenders
La Liga players
Segunda División B players
Atlético Madrid B players
Atlético Madrid footballers
Real Betis players
Spain youth international footballers
Spain under-21 international footballers
Spain under-23 international footballers
Spain international footballers
Footballers at the 1992 Summer Olympics
Olympic footballers of Spain
Olympic gold medalists for Spain
Olympic medalists in football
Medalists at the 1992 Summer Olympics